The name Chedeng has been used for five tropical cyclones in the Philippines by PAGASA in the Western Pacific Ocean.

 Severe Tropical Storm Linfa (2003) (T0304, 05W, Chedeng), struck the Philippines and Japan
 Typhoon Pabuk (2007) (T0706, 07W, Chedeng), struck Taiwan and China
 Typhoon Songda (2011) (T1102, 04W, Chedeng), Category 5 super typhoon that brushed the Philippines and Japan
 Typhoon Maysak (2015) (T1504, 04W, Chedeng), Category 5 super typhoon that made landfall on Luzon as a minimal tropical storm
 Tropical Depression 03W (2019) (T1903, 03W, Chedeng), made landfall on Palau and Mindanao

Pacific typhoon set index articles